Peters Township may refer to:

Canada
Peters Township, a geographic township in the Unorganized North Part of Sudbury District, Ontario

United States
 Peters Township, Kingman County, Kansas
 Peters Township, Franklin County, Pennsylvania
 Peters Township, Washington County, Pennsylvania

Township name disambiguation pages